Richard Holmes (born 1 January 1963) is a British film producer.

Career
Holmes began his career in a comedy double-act, The Gruber Brothers, with Stefan Schwartz. He produced Schwartz's debut feature film, the award-winning Soft Top Hard Shoulder (1993), winner of a BAFTA Scotland for Best Film and Best Actor. He went on to co-write and produce Shooting Fish (1997) starring Kate Beckinsale, Stuart Townsend and Dan Futterman.

He then produced the multi-award-winning Waking Ned (1998) written and directed by Kirk Jones. He was nominated, alongside his producing partner Glynis Murray, for a Producers Guild of America Award for the film.

From 1999 - 2002 he was Managing Director of Civilian Content Plc.

In 2008 he produced, alongside Christian Colson, the critically acclaimed feature film Eden Lake (2008), written and directed by James Watkins.

In 2011 he produced the film adaptation of the novel Resistance by Owen Sheers, the debut film for director Amit Gupta. The film stars Andrea Riseborough and Michael Sheen. Sharon Morgan won a BAFTA Cymru for her portrayal of Maggie.

Jadoo, another film he produced for Gupta, opened the 2013 Berlinale International Film Festival, Kulinarisches section. The film stars Tom Milson, Harish Patel, Amara Karan, Kulvinder Ghir, Adeel Akhtar and Nikesh Patel.

Later that year he produced Keeping Rosy starring Maxine Peake and Blake Harrison.  Peake won a Best Actress award at the Fantasporto Film Festival for the film.

From 2013 to 2016 he worked at Creative England and executive produced 45 Years which won multiple awards for Andrew Haig and actors Charlotte Rampling and Tom Courtenay. He also executive produced The Ecstasy of Wilko Johnson, Orion: The Man Who Would Be King, Notes On Blindness, God's Own Country, Calibre and The Girl with All the Gifts.

In 2017 he produced The Ritual based on the novel by Adam Nevill and starring Rafe Spall.

He is married to actress Catherine Russell.

Filmography
Soft Top Hard Shoulder (1993) (producer)
Solitaire For 2 (1995) (producer)
Shooting Fish (1997) (co-writer, producer)
Waking Ned (1998) (producer)
The Jolly Boys' Last Stand (2000) (executive producer)
Dead Babies (2000) (producer)
The Abduction Club (2002) (producer)
Eden Lake (2008) (producer)
Resistance (2011) (producer)
Jadoo (2012) (producer) 
Keeping Rosy (2013) (producer) 
45 Years (2014) (executive producer) 
Orion: The Man Who Would Be King (2015) (executive producer) 
God's Own Country (2017) (executive producer)
Calibre (film) (2017) (executive producer) 
The Ecstasy Of Wilko Johnson (2015) (executive producer)
The Ritual (2017) (producer)

References

External links

British film producers
Living people
1963 births